Paul Cheema Singh (born 26 September 1920) is an Indian former sports shooter. He competed in the 25 metre pistol event at the 1960 Summer Olympics.

References

External links
 

1920 births
Possibly living people
People from Ludhiana district
Indian male sport shooters
Olympic shooters of India
Shooters at the 1960 Summer Olympics